James Birch (born 24 November 1989, in London) is a British professional race driver. Birch is currently racing in British GT, last year racing for Century Motorsport in a Ginetta G55 GT4 spec car. Birch is a silver-rated handicap driver, winning championships across the motorsport ladder, from Karting, to Single Seaters and GT racing

Birch has one World title, one European title and three British championships to his name, over an 18-year career to date. He is also currently 20th in the all-time record for British drivers for Pole Positions over their career.

Birch studied at Durham University where, in addition to his driving activities, he captained the Hatfield College football team. He was an  'Elite Athlete Scholar' during his time as a student; and continues to be an ambassador for the GLL Sports Foundation.

James is also Co-Founder of InsurTech startup Pluto.Insure

Racing Career Summary 

Racing History

References

Driver DB - https://www.driverdb.com/countries/great-britain/

External links
www.jamesbirchracing.co.uk, personal website

1989 births
Living people
English racing drivers
Alumni of Hatfield College, Durham
Ginetta GT4 Supercup drivers